Kenneth Røpke (born 17 August 1965) is a Danish former cyclist. He competed in the 1 km time trial event at the 1988 Summer Olympics.

References

External links
 

1965 births
Living people
Danish male cyclists
Olympic cyclists of Denmark
Cyclists at the 1988 Summer Olympics
People from Gentofte Municipality
Sportspeople from the Capital Region of Denmark